Lancaster County Airport , also known as McWhirter Field, is a county-owned, public-use airport located four nautical miles (7 km) west of the central business district of Lancaster, in Lancaster County, South Carolina, United States.

Although most U.S. airports use the same three-letter location identifier for the FAA and IATA, this airport is assigned LKR by the FAA but has no designation from the IATA (which assigned LKR to Las Khoreh in Somalia).

Facilities and aircraft 
It has one runway designated 6/24 with an asphalt surface measuring 6,004 by 100 feet (1,830 x 30 m).

For the 12-month period ending July 22, 2009, the airport had 23,850 aircraft operations, an average of 65 per day: 97% general aviation, 2% air taxi, and 1% military. At that time there were 49 single-engine aircraft based at this airport.

Lancaster County Airport is operated by Lancaster Aviation and provides fuel, maintenance and a terminal facility.

References

External links 
 Aerial photo as of 20 February 1994 from USGS The National Map
 

Airports in South Carolina
Buildings and structures in Lancaster County, South Carolina
Transportation in Lancaster County, South Carolina